Live At The Astoria, London (31.10.07) is the first live album by American rock band Black Stone Cherry. The album was released on October 31, 2007, by Concert Live. It is a two disc set of Black Stone Cherry's show at The Astoria in London, England. This was the last show of Black Stone Cherry's tour.

The track Yeah Man is a Black Stone Cherry original and this is its first release.

Track listing
Disc One
Rain Wizard - 3:40
Backwoods Gold - 3:24
Yeah Man - 3:15
Rollin' On - 6:38
Violator Girl - 4:13
Big City Lights - 5:40
Hell and High Water - 4:09
Shapes of Things - 3:17
Folsom Prison Blues - 6:51
Disc Two
Crosstown Woman - 4:35
Hoochie Coochie Man - 4:57
Drum Solo (In the middle of Hoochie Coochie Man) - 4:54
End of Hoochie Coochie Man - 1:46
Lonely Train - 5:00
Shooting Star - 5:46
Maybe Someday - 4:16
Guitar Solos - 4:06
Voodoo Child (Slight Return) - 5:10

Personnel
Chris Robertson - Lead vocals and Lead guitar
Ben Wells - Rhythm Guitar and Backing vocals
Jon Lawhon - Bass and Backing vocals
John Fred Young - drums and Backing vocals

External links
Black Stone Cherry's Official Website

Black Stone Cherry albums
2007 live albums
Roadrunner Records live albums